Isabelle Fijalkowski, now Isabelle Fijalkowski-Tournebize (born May 23, 1972 in Clermont-Ferrand, Puy-de-Dôme), is a retired French basketball player. She was inducted into the French Basketball Hall of Fame, in 2011.

Career

United States
Fijalkowski played college basketball for University of Colorado, then was drafted by the Cleveland Rockers in 1997.

Achievements

France national team
 9th at 1994 World Championship
  Finalist of EuroBasket 1993 and EuroBasket 1999
 5th at the 2000 Olympic Games of Sydney
  EuroBasket 2001: champion
 200 selections.

Club 
 Winner of the EuroLeague Women: 1997, 2002 (Runner-up: 1999, 2001)
 Winner of French championship: 1992, 1996, 1997, 2001 et 2002
 Winner of the Italian championship: 1998, 1999
 Tournoi de la Fédération: 1996, 2001, 2002
 MVP of the French championship 1996-1997
 MVP of the Italian championship 1998-1999

Career statistics

Regular season

|-
| style="text-align:left;"|1997
| style="text-align:left;"|Cleveland
| 28 || 28 || 28.7 || .508 || .250 || .786 || 5.6 || 2.4 || 0.6 || 0.6 || 2.6 || 11.9
|-
| style="text-align:left;"|1998
| style="text-align:left;"|Cleveland
| 28 || 23 || 28.8 || .547 || .400 || .821 || 6.9 || 2.1 || 0.6 || 1.0 || 2.9 || 13.7
|-
| style="text-align:left;"|Career
| style="text-align:left;"|2 years, 1 team
| 56 || 51 || 28.7 || .528 || .357 || .804 || 6.2 || 2.3 || 0.6 || 0.8 || 2.8 || 12.8

Playoffs

|-
| style="text-align:left;"|1998
| style="text-align:left;"|Cleveland
| 3 || 3 || 35.7 || .425 || .000 || .864 || 9.0 || 1.3 || 0.7 || 0.7 || 1.7 || 17.7

References 

1972 births
Living people
Basketball players at the 2000 Summer Olympics
Cleveland Rockers players
Colorado Buffaloes women's basketball players
French expatriate basketball people in Italy
French expatriate basketball people in the United States
French people of Polish descent
French women's basketball players
Olympic basketball players of France
Power forwards (basketball)
Sportspeople from Clermont-Ferrand
FIBA Hall of Fame inductees